The Fennek, named after the fennec (a species of small desert fox), or LGS Fennek, with LGS being short for Leichter Gepanzerter Spähwagen in German (Light Armoured Reconnaissance Vehicle), is a four-wheeled armed reconnaissance vehicle produced by the German company Krauss-Maffei Wegmann and Dutch Defence Vehicle Systems. The Turkish company FNSS Defence Systems acquired the right for licence production in 2004. It was developed for both the German Army and Royal Netherlands Army to replace their current vehicles.

History
In April 2000, the prototype vehicle finished field trials and in December 2001 a combined order was placed. The Royal Netherlands Army ordered 410 (202 reconnaissance, 130 MRAT (medium range antitank) and 78 general purpose versions) and the German Bundeswehr ordered 222 (178 reconnaissance, 24 combat engineer and 20 joint fire support teams (JFST)). More Fenneks for the German Army will be procured from 2015 on. Germany plans an overall purchase of approximately 300 Fenneks. The first vehicle was delivered to the Netherlands in July 2003 and the first to Germany in December of the same year. Deliveries will continue until 2011 (additional orders for the German Army are planned from 2015 on).

The Dutch SP Aerospace company, which produced the Fennek for the Dutch military, was declared bankrupt in August 2004. A new company called Dutch Defence Vehicle Systems (DDVS) was created to continue the production of the vehicles for the Royal Netherlands Army.

Specifications
The Fennek has four wheels with selectable two or four wheel drive. It has a Deutz diesel engine producing 179 kW, giving it a top speed of 115 km/h (when the speedlimiter is turned off). Tire pressure can be regulated by the driver from inside the vehicle to suit terrain conditions.

The primary mission equipment is an observation package mounted on an extendable mast. Sensors include a thermal imager, daylight camera and a laser rangefinder. Combined with the vehicle's GPS and inertial navigation system the operator can accurately mark targets or points of interest and pass that data to the digital battlefield network. The sensor head of the observation package can also be removed and mounted on a tripod for concealed operation, as can the control unit from the vehicle should the crew want to use the entire system dismounted. Many Fenneks of the German Army are also equipped with Aladin miniature UAVs.

Various weapons can be fitted, such as a 12.7 mm machine gun for the Dutch reconnaissance version, a Rafael Spike anti-tank missile on the Dutch MRAT version or a 40 mm automatic grenade launcher (HK GMG) or Rheinmetall MG3 for the German vehicles. The Royal Netherlands Army also placed an order at the Turkish company ASELSAN for 18 Raytheon Stinger surface-to-air missile launchers to be fitted on the Fennek. The launcher in this case is the Stinger Weapon Platform (SWP), with four Stinger missiles intended for mid-range air defence. The launcher can be controlled from on board the vehicle, or else remotely as part of a distributed air defense system. On the Dutch Fennek the primary weapon is the 12.7 mm machine gun.

The vehicle is protected all-round against 7.62 mm rounds and additional armour can be added if the mission requires. The air conditioning system provides protection against nuclear, biological and chemical warfare and the crew compartment is protected against anti-personnel mines.

Operational history
Both Germany and the Netherlands have deployed Fennek reconnaissance vehicles to Afghanistan in support of ISAF. On the 3rd of November, 2007, a Dutch Fennek was hit by an improvised explosive device killing one and wounding two other occupants. The vehicle and its crew were taking part in an offensive operation targeting the Taliban in the province of Uruzgan, Afghanistan.
In another incident a German Fennek was hit by a rocket-propelled grenade. Its hollow charge jet penetrated the vehicle through the right front wheel rim, passed through the vehicle and blew the left door off the hinge. Thanks to the spall liner the crew sustained only negligible injuries.

Operators

Current operators
 
 German Army - 222, to be increased to 248
 
 Royal Netherlands Army - 365

Future operators
 
 Qatari Emiri Land Force - 32
 
 Ukrainian Armed Forces

Gallery

See also
"Combat Reconnaissance/Patrol Vehicle" with rear engine:
 RBY MK 1
 D-442 FÚG
 ABC-79M
 BRDM-2
 Textron Tactical Armoured Patrol Vehicle

Others:
Armoured fighting vehicle
List of modern armoured fighting vehicles

References

External links

Dutch Cavalry Museum has a prototype of the Fennek in its collection

Reconnaissance vehicles of the post–Cold War period
Armoured fighting vehicles of Germany
Post–Cold War military vehicles of Germany
Scout cars
Armoured fighting vehicles of the Netherlands
Military vehicles introduced in the 2000s